The 2020 General Aung San Shield is the sixth season of Myanmar knockout football competition. The tournament is organized by the Myanmar Football Federation. This cup succeeded the Myanmar Football Federation Cup. It got cancelled due to the COVID-19 pandemic in Myanmar.

Qualifying rounds
Twenty-five teams, including MNL, MNL 2, and five amateur clubs will compete in the tournament with first round matches involving 12 teams: 10/Mon versus Paung Laung, University versus Kachin United, Junior Lions versus Yaw Myay, Myawady versus champion of the Yangon Premier League, Silver Stars versus play-off winner from amateur teams, and Mawyawady versus Happy Friendship on April 8 and 9.

Results

Preliminary round
Preliminary round consists of two rounds for teams currently playing in the Regional League Division 1 level. The First round was held 8 April 2020.

First round

Second round

Quarter-final

Semi-final

First leg

Second leg

Final

Top goalscorers

Due to the COVID-19 pandemic in Myanmar the tournament was cancelled and declared null and void by the Myanmar Football Federation. At that time, the preliminary round had been played.

Sponsor

Official Main Sponsor
 Myanmar Brewery Ltd

Official Partner
 AYA Bank

Media Broadcasting
 MWD

FB Partner
 My Sports

Co-sponsor
 100plus
 AYA Myanmar Insurance
 M-150
 Canon
 FBT
 Genius Sports
 JCB Card
 Molten
 Z-Tech Solution

References

External links
General Aung San Shield Facebook page

General Aung San Shield
General Aung San Shield
General Aung San Shield
General Aung San Shield, 2020